Red Kite (formed in 2014 in Oslo, Norway) is a Norwegian prog-jazz band.

Biography 
Red Kite is a band composed of Norwegian jazz, prog, impro and rock musicians. The members come from the bands Shining, Elephant9, Bushman's Revenge and Grand General. The band's sound blends psychedelic 1970s rock and experimental jazz with visceral grooves and fuzz guitar. The band played at Vossajazz and at Nattjazz in 2016.

Band members 
 Bernt Moen - keyboards
 Even Helte Hermansen - guitar
 Trond Frønes - bass
 Torstein Lofthus - drums

References

External links 
RedKite Live at Likefm.org

Norwegian experimental musical groups
Musical groups established in 2014
2014 establishments in Norway
Musical groups from Oslo
RareNoiseRecords artists